Emir Granov (born 17 February 1976 in Sarajevo) is a retired Bosnian-Herzegovinian footballer.

International career
He made his debut for Bosnia and Herzegovina in an August 1999 friendly match away against Liechtenstein and has earned a total of 6 caps, scoring no goals. His final international was a June 2001 friendly against Uzbekistan.

References

External links

 Profile at Voetbal International.
 Profile at LFP.

1976 births
Living people
Footballers from Sarajevo
Association football forwards
Bosnia and Herzegovina footballers
Bosnia and Herzegovina international footballers
FK Sarajevo players
S.C. Farense players
Újpest FC players
Rayo Vallecano players
Premier League of Bosnia and Herzegovina players
Primeira Liga players
Nemzeti Bajnokság I players
La Liga players
Bosnia and Herzegovina expatriate footballers
Expatriate footballers in Portugal
Bosnia and Herzegovina expatriate sportspeople in Portugal
Expatriate footballers in Hungary
Bosnia and Herzegovina expatriate sportspeople in Hungary
Expatriate footballers in Spain
Bosnia and Herzegovina expatriate sportspeople in Spain